Myint Myint Khin  (15 December 1923 – 19 June 2014) was a Burmese medical professor and writer. An English major at the University of Rangoon, she was the chair of the Department of Medicine of the Institute of Medicine, Mandalay from 1965 to 1984, and served as a consultant at the World Health Organization from 1985 to 1991. Her literary career began in 1996, spurred on by the HIV/AIDS crisis in the country. She published 11 books in Burmese and two in English. At the time of her death, the former professor was collaborating on an English language book on the history of medical education in the country.

Most of her books dealt with public health and medicine. One notable exception was her last published book in 2013, Poetry for Me, a collection of her English language poetry, which she began working on after the death of her husband Dr. San Baw, a hip replacement pioneer, in 1984. Through her books and interviews, she advocated for more openness and transparency in the country, and spoke out about the regression of women's rights in Myanmar. In 2012, she founded a daycare center for elderly physicians in Yangon.

Early life and education
Myint Myint Khin was born on 15 December 1923 in Bassein (Pathein), in the Irrawaddy delta in British Burma. The oldest of three siblings, she grew up in the nearby delta town of Henzada (Hinthada), before moving to Rangoon (Yangon) as a teenager. She was not yet 15 when she enrolled at the University of Rangoon in 1938 to study English literature, and there she became "obsessed" by the works of poet John Donne.

However, her studies were interrupted by the arrival of World War II in 1941. In a 2013 interview, she said that the war years were a time of "tremendous adversity" and "anguish" during which she lost her mother and brother, and her family lost their property. Her brother was killed by a bomb, and she had to go and retrieve her dead brother's body. Furthermore, the loss of property caused "fears and insecurities in the aftermath of World War II".

Yet it was also the war that got her into medicine. With all the colleges in the country shut down, she enrolled at the only university level school opened during the Japanese occupation: the wartime medical school founded by Drs. Ba Than, S. Sen and Yin May in 1943. After the war, she completed her original major, receiving a BA in English literature in 1946, and then promptly continued her medical education at the just reopened Faculty of Medicine, graduating with an MBBS in 1950.

Medical career

Early years
Though Myint Myint Khin got into medicine by happenstance, she excelled at it. After starting out as a staff physician (Civil Assistant Surgeon) at Rangoon General Hospital in 1950, she did her residency at the University of Pennsylvania medical school, and received an MD in 1955. She graduated ahead of her husband San Baw, the medical school classmate she married in 1953 who received an MD and an MS in 1958, also from Penn Medicine. Meanwhile, she finished her training abroad by getting her FRCP from the Royal College of Physicians of Edinburgh.

Mandalay years
Back in Burma, she was appointed Clinical Professor of Medicine at the Faculty of Medicine of Mandalay University in 1960, joining her husband who had been chief of orthopedic surgery at Mandalay General Hospital since 1957. In 1965, she was promoted to be the head of the Department of Medicine, becoming the first woman chair at the school. According to a 1967 BMJ article, she was the only female head of Department of Medicine in the country's three medical schools at the time.

She was widely respected by her colleagues and her students. According to Prof. Myint Myint Aye, the retired head of the Department of Medicine at the Institute of Medicine, Mandalay (1987–1990), her elder colleague was "widely respected for her excellent lectures and informative clinical bedside teachings", and "she recruited young graduates with promising potential and built the strongest department of medicine in Burma which produced hundreds and thousands of doctors meeting the international standard. These doctors are now not only serving Burma, but all over the world.” She is remembered as an inspirational and "towering figure" by her students, who affectionately called her "Mummy Gyi" ("elder mummy"), while Prof. Myint Myint Aye was known as "Mummy Lay" ("younger mummy".) Myint Myint Khin's description of herself was harsher: a demanding professor who could come across as "aggressive" and "abrasive".

She retired abruptly after the death of her husband of 31 years on 7 December 1984. Still in mourning, she was greeted with more bad news less than three months later. Their only son Myint Zan, who had returned from Los Angeles to see his dying father, was locked up in political detention without charge and trial by the BSPP government. He was placed in solitary confinement in the notorious Insein Prison, and given no contact with the outside world, including his mother.

Career abroad
Now "mired in a deep personal crisis", Myint Myint Khin left the country. She first took up a post as a visiting professor of medicine at the National University of Malaysia. After a few months, she moved to New Delhi to become a consultant in the World Health Organization’s Southeast Asia regional office. She served for six years on the WHO panel of experts in health manpower development, before retiring in 1991.

Literary career
It was during the years abroad that she began writing English language poetry. In a 2013 interview, she said she began writing poetry "because I could not bear not to write them" as an outlet from her personal crises. Later, she was inspired to write more poetry after visiting Sri Lanka when she was struck by the country's natural beauty. She said that she kept her love for poetry a secret from everyone including her husband and son; she continued that given her no non-sense public persona, her students would have been surprised by her "sentimental and emotive" side.

At any rate, her first published book came amidst the HIV/AIDS crisis in Myanmar. (She had written for the Myanmar Medical Journal, and developed handbooks and audio tapes as study aids for medical students.) In 1996, she published The Bells Tolling for Everyone, which calls attention to the menace of HIV/AIDS on the country. Frustrated by the dismissive attitude of the officials, and the low reported percentage of HIV infections in the country, she called for an expansion of general health education with "openness and transparency". To her, "the beginning of secrecy is the end of the truth." She followed up with books on topics such as cancer, diabetes, and heart disease as well as her vision on the development of medicine in the country.

It was only in 2013 that the then 89-year-old former English major published her first English poetry book Poetry for Me. Her poetry often focused on her late husband. One such example is as follows:

But close to my heart is a treasure trove,
To draw upon if I chose
Happiness shared, joys that glow
And tenderness, I only know

It turned out to be her last published book. In all, between 1996 and 2013, she published 11 books in Burmese and two in English. At her time of death, she was working on an English language book A History of Medical Education in Burma in collaboration with other physicians to tell the history of medical education in Myanmar from the colonial period to the present.

Activism

Myint Myint Khin maintained an active life until the last four months of her life. She also continued to voice her opinions strongly. According to Thane-Oke Kyaw Myint, a retired paediatrician and founder of the Alumni Myanmar Institutes of Medicine Association (AMIMA), "she had openly written articles in the newspapers on what was wrong with educational systems in Burma, never hesitating to openly criticise the present and the past governments, a stand that very few of us could or dare to do so publicly". For example, in 2004, she gave an interview to The Irrawaddy, then an exile run media outlet, in which she, quoting Orwell, highlighted the general lack of openness and transparency in the country as the root of many of its problems.

She also spoke out about women's rights. She bemoaned the "truly backward" state of women's rights under the military regimes, away from the traditional Burmese culture. She wrote about the importance of general education, particularly literacy among women, for example to combat the HIV/AIDS crisis. She maintained that "The literacy rate among women influences a household’s health and even life style. You ought to invest in women."

She was a member of the Myanmar Medical Association, and once served as president of the Mandalay chapter, and twice on its board. In 2012, in association with the MMA and the Myint Myint Khin Foundation, she founded "Support Group for Elderly Doctors", which began operating a daycare center for elderly physicians in Tamwe Township, Yangon. Funded by the donations and free services of other physicians, many of whom were her former students, the center provided a place for elder physicians aged 70 and over, not all of whom were well off financially, to socialize as well as receive free medical checkups.

Personal life
Myint Myint Khin was married to her medical school classmate San Baw from 1953 to his death in 1984. As chief of orthopedic surgery at Mandalay General Hospital, San Baw "pioneered the use of ivory hip prostheses to replace ununited fractures of the neck of the femur." Their only child Myint Zan is a former professor of law, who taught at universities in Malaysia, Australia, the South Pacific and the United States from 1989 to 2016.

Death
Myint Myint Khin died on 19 June 2014 in Yangon. She had been receiving treatment for heart and kidney failures during the past four months. She was 90.

See also

Notes

References

Bibliography
 
 
 
 
 
 
 
 
 
 
 
 
 
 
 
 

1923 births
2014 deaths
20th-century Burmese women writers
20th-century Burmese writers
21st-century Burmese women writers
21st-century Burmese writers
20th-century women physicians
21st-century women physicians
21st-century Burmese physicians
20th-century Burmese physicians
Academic staff of the National University of Malaysia
People from Ayeyarwady Region
University of Yangon alumni
University of Medicine 1, Yangon alumni
University of Pennsylvania alumni
Fellows of the Royal College of Physicians of Edinburgh